Meleagrin and its derivatives such as oxaline are bio-active benzylisoquinoline alkaloids made by deep ocean Penicillium.

Notes
Alkaloids from a deep ocean sediment-derived fungus Penicillium sp. and their antitumor activities

Imidazoles
Indole alkaloids
Lactams
Penicillium
Heterocyclic compounds with 4 rings
Nitrogen heterocycles